Iris DeBrito is a Brazilian former professional footballer who played in the North American Soccer League.

In 1967, DeBrito signed with the New York Generals of the National Professional Soccer League.  He moved to the Chicago Spurs during the season.  In 1968, the NPSL merged with the United Soccer Association to form the North American Soccer League and the Spurs moved to Kansas City where they became the Kansas City Spurs.  DeBrito played only two games with the Spurs in 1968 before being traded to the Toronto Falcons.  He did not play in the NASL in 1969 or 1970, but returned to the league in 1971 with the Rochester Lancers.  

He played in the National Soccer League with Toronto First Portuguese for the 1973 season. In 1974, he began the pre-season with the Los Angeles Aztecs but was traded to the Denver Dynamos a week before the season opener. In 1976, he played in the American Soccer League with Chicago Cats.

References

External links
 NASL career stats

1945 births
Living people
Footballers from Rio de Janeiro (city)
Brazilian footballers
Brazilian expatriate footballers
Chicago Spurs players
Denver Dynamos players
Kansas City Spurs players
National Professional Soccer League (1967) players
New York Generals (NPSL) players
North American Soccer League (1968–1984) players
Rochester Lancers (1967–1980) players
Toronto Falcons (1967–68) players
Expatriate soccer players in Canada
Expatriate soccer players in the United States
Association football forwards
Toronto First Portuguese players
Chicago Cats players
Canadian National Soccer League players
American Soccer League (1933–1983) players
Brazilian expatriate sportspeople in Canada
Brazilian expatriate sportspeople in the United States